is a district of Chiyoda, Tokyo, Japan. As of April 1, 2007, its population is 16. Its postal code is 101-0027. Note that Hirakawachō, also located in the Chiyoda ward, is a completely different district.

Kanda-Hirakawachō is located on the northeastern part of the Chiyoda ward. It borders Kanda-Sakumachō 2-chōme to the north, east and south. It borders Kanda-Sakumachō 1-chōme to the west, the Showa-Dōri Avenue forming its western boundary.

Education
 operates public elementary and junior high schools. Izumi Elementary School (千代田区立和泉小学校) is the zoned elementary school for Kanda-Hirakawachō. There is a freedom of choice system for junior high schools in Chiyoda Ward, and so there are no specific junior high school zones.

References

Districts of Chiyoda, Tokyo